The 1948 Santa Clara Broncos football team was an American football team that represented Santa Clara University as an independent during the 1948 college football season. In their third season under head coach Len Casanova, the Broncos compiled a 7–2–1 record and outscored their opponents by a combined total of 228 to 153. They played a schedule that included elite programs of the era, defeating Oklahoma and Stanford and playing a tie against Michigan State. (Oklahoma won 31 straight games after the loss to Santa Clara.) Santa Clara's sole losses in 1948  were to California and No. 10 SMU featuring Doak Walker.

Schedule

References

Santa Clara
Santa Clara Broncos football seasons
Santa Clara Broncos football